A. Rangapura  is a village in the southern state of Karnataka, India. It is located in the Tarikere taluk of Chikkamagaluru district in Karnataka.

See also
 Chikmagalur
 Districts of Karnataka

References

External links
   A. Rangapura listed on Government of India Website.

Villages in Chikkamagaluru district